The Johnson River is a river of the northwestern South Island of New Zealand. It is located within the Radiant Range and flows mostly in a southerly direction to join with the Allen River shortly before the latter joins the Mōkihinui River North Branch.

See also
List of rivers of New Zealand

References

Rivers of the West Coast, New Zealand
Rivers of New Zealand